Cyclic nucleotide gated channel beta 1, also known as CNGB1, is a human gene encoding an ion channel protein.

See also
 Cyclic nucleotide-gated ion channel

References

Further reading

External links
  GeneReviews/NCBI/NIH/UW entry on Retinitis Pigmentosa Overview
 
 
 

Ion channels